A space force is a military branch of a nation's armed forces that conducts military operations in outer space and space warfare. The world's first space force was the Russian Space Forces, established in 1992 as an independent military service. However, it lost its independence twice, first being absorbed into the Strategic Rocket Forces from 1997 to 2001 and again in 2015, when it was merged with the Russian Air Force to form the Russian Aerospace Forces, where it now exists as a sub-branch.  the world's only independent space forces are the United States Space Force and China's People's Liberation Army Strategic Support Force, which also is China's cyber force.

Countries with smaller or developing space forces may combine their air and space forces under a single military branch, such as the Russian Aerospace Forces, French Air and Space Force, or Iranian Islamic Revolutionary Guard Corps Aerospace Force, or put them in an independent defense agency, such as the Indian Defence Space Agency. Countries with nascent military space capabilities usually organize them within their air forces.

History

The first artificial object to cross the Kármán line, the boundary between air and space, was MW 18014, an A-4 rocket launched by the German Heer on 20 June 1944 from the Peenemünde Army Research Center. The A4, more commonly known as the V-2, was the world's first ballistic missile, used by the Wehrmacht to launch long-range attacks on the Allied Forces on the Western Front during the Second World War. The designer of the A4, Wernher von Braun, had aspirations to use them as space launch vehicles. In both the United States and the Soviet Union, military space development began immediately after the Second World War concluded, with Wernher von Braun defecting to the Allies and both superpowers gathering V-2 rockets, research materials, and German scientists to jumpstart their own ballistic missile and space programs.

In the United States, there was a fierce interservice rivalry between the U.S. Air Force and U.S. Army over which service would gain responsibility for the military space program, with the Air Force, which had started developing its space program while it was the Army Air Forces in 1945, seeing space operations as an extension of their strategic airpower mission, while the Army argued that ballistic missiles were an extension of artillery. The Navy also developed rockets as well, but primarily for Naval Research Laboratory projects, rather than seeking to actively develop an operational space capability. Ultimately, the Air Force's space rivals in the Army Ballistic Missile Agency, Naval Research Laboratory, and Advanced Research Projects Agency were absorbed by NASA when it was created in 1958, leaving it as the only major military space organization within the U.S. Department of Defense. In 1954, General Bernard Schriever established the Western Development Division within Air Research and Development Command, becoming the U.S. military's first space organization, which continues to exist in the U.S. Space Force as the Space Systems Command, its research and development center.

During the 1960s and 1970s, Air Force space forces were organized within Aerospace Defense Command for missile defense and space surveillance forces, Strategic Air Command  for weather reconnaissance satellites, and Air Force Systems Command for satellite communications, space launch, and space development systems. In 1982, U.S. Air Force space forces were centralized in Air Force Space Command, the first direct predecessor to the U.S. Space Force. U.S. space forces were first employed in the Vietnam War, and continued to provide satellite communications, weather, and navigation support during the 1982 Falklands War, 1983 United States invasion of Grenada, 1986 United States bombing of Libya, and 1989 United States invasion of Panama. The first major employment of space forces culminated in the Gulf War, where they proved so critical to the U.S.-led coalition, that it is sometimes referred to as the first space war. The first discussions of creating a military space service in the United States occurred in 1958, with the idea being floated by President Reagan as well in 1982. The 2001 Space Commission argued for the creation of a Space Corps between 2007 and 2011 and a bipartisan proposal in the U.S. Congress would have created a Space Corps in 2017. On 20 December 2019, the United States Space Force Act, part of the National Defense Authorization Act for 2020, was signed, creating an independent space service by renaming and reorganizing Air Force Space Command into the United States Space Force.

In the Soviet Union, the early space program was led by the OKB-1 design bureau, led by Sergei Korolev. Unlike in the United States, where the U.S. Air Force held preeminence in missile and space development, the Soviet Ground Forces, and specifically the Artillery of the Reserve of the Supreme High Command (RVGK), was responsible for missile and military space programs, with the RVGK responsible for the launch of Sputnik 1, the world's first artificial satellite on 4 October 1957. In 1960, Soviet military space forces were reorganized into the 3rd Department of the Main Missile Directorate of the Ministry of Defence, before in 1964 becoming a part of the new Soviet Strategic Rocket Forces Central Directorate of Space Assets. The Strategic Rocket Forces Central Directorate of Space Assets would be renamed the Main Directorate of Space Assets in 1970, being transferred to directly report to the Soviet Ministry of Defense in 1982, and in 1986 became the Chief Directorate of Space Assets. Established in 1967, the Anti-Ballistic Missile and Anti-Space Defense Forces of the Soviet Air Defense Forces were responsible for space surveillance and defense operations.

When the Soviet Union collapsed in 1991 the Russian Federation gained its space forces, with the Chief Directorate of Space Assets was reorganized into the Military Space Forces, an independent troops (vid) under the Russian Ministry of Defense, but not a military service (vid). The Soviet Air Defense Forces' Anti-Ballistic Missile and Anti-Space Defense Forces were reorganized into the Russian Air Defense Forces' . In 1997, the Rocket and Space Defence Troops and Military Space Forces were merged into the Strategic Missile Forces; it subordinated the priorities of the space troops to the missile forces, resulting in the establishment of the Russian Space Forces as independent troops in 2001. In 2011, the Russian Space Forces became the Russian Space Command, part of the Russian Aerospace Defense Forces, which merged Russia's space and air defense forces into one service. In 2015, the Russian Air Force and Russian Aerospace Defense Forces were merged to form the Russian Aerospace Forces, which reestablished the Russian Space Forces as one of its three sub-branches, although it is no longer an independent entity.

In 1998, the Chinese People's Liberation Army began to organize its space forces under the General Armaments Department, before in 2015 reorganizing them as the People's Liberation Army Strategic Support Force Space Systems Department.

The Spanish Government announced in June 2022 that the Spanish Air Force would be renamed as the Spanish Air and Space Force.

Space forces

The following list outlines the independent space forces currently in operation:
 People's Liberation Army Strategic Support Force
 United States Space Force

Formerly independent space forces include:
 Russian Space Forces (1992-1997/2001-2011)

See also
 List of space forces, units, and formations
 Ranks and insignia of space forces
 Militarisation of space
 Politics of outer space
 Space Force Association

References

Military branches
Types of military forces
Outer space
Space law
Space warfare